Nara or Na-ra may refer to:

Places and jurisdictions 
 Nara Prefecture, a prefecture of Japan
 Nara, Nara, the capital city of Nara Prefecture, Japan
 Nara, an ancient Roman city in Tunisia, now called Bir El Hafey
 Nara, Attock, a village in Attock, Pakistan
 Nara, Jhelum, a village in Jhelum, Pakistan
 Nara Matore, a village in Kahuta Tehsil, Rawalpindi District, Punjab, Pakistan
 Nara, Khyber Pakhtunkhwa, a Union Council of Abbottabad, Pakistan
 Nara, Mali, a town in Mali
 Nara Basin, a valley in Nara Prefecture, Japan
 Nara Canal, an excavated waterway in Sindh province, Pakistan
 Nara Canal, a paleochannel of the Indus and the Hakra, partly used by the Nara Canal
 Nara (Oka), a river in Russia
 Nara River (India), a river in Gujarat, India
 Nara Burnu, a cape in Turkey

People and society 
 Nara people, a Nilotic ethnic minority inhabiting Eritrea
 Nara language, the mother tongue of the Nara people
 Nara clan, a Manchu clan in China
 National Radical Camp or Nara Party, several Polish nationalist groups

People with the name Nara

Given name
 Nara Nath Acharya (1906–1988), Nepalese poet
 Nara Apaya, king of the Mrauk-U Dynasty of Arakan
 Nara Bahadur Bista, Nepalese politician
 Nara Bahadur Dahal (born 1960), Nepalese long-distance runner
 Nara Falcón (born 1981), Mexican synchronized swimmer
 Jang Na-ra (born 1981), South Korean female singer
 Nara Bahadur Karmacharya, Nepalese politician
 Nara Kollery (died 2015), Indian sound recordist
 Kwon Nara (born 1991), South Korean female singer
 Nara Leão (1942–1989), Brazilian female singer
 Nara Lokesh (born 1983), Indian male politician
 Nara Rohit (born 1984), Indian film actor and producer
 Nara Bhupal Shah (1697–1743), king of the Gorkha state in Nepal

Surname
 Erika Nara, Japanese Paralympic swimmer
 Kurumi Nara (born 1991), Japanese tennis player
 Rao Nara (1420–1487), crown Prince of Nadol, India
, Japanese basketball player
 Takeji Nara (1868–1962), general in the Imperial Japanese Army
 Tatsuki Nara (born 1993), Japanese footballer
 Tatunca Nara (born 1941), German-Brazilian jungle guide who invented the lost city of Akakor
 Tōru Nara, Japanese voice actor
 Wanda Nara (born 1986), Argentine media personality and football agent
 Yasuyoshi Nara (born 1982), Japanese football player
 Yoshitomo Nara (born 1959), Japanese artist
 Zaira Nara (born 1988), Argentine model and TV host
 Ula Nara Duoqimuli, Empress consort of Qing dynasty Yongzheng Emperor

Arts and mythology 
 Nara (Arjuna), Arjuna in his previous birth was Nara
 Nara (comics), a fictional character from Marvel Comics
 One of the twins Nara-Narayana in Hindu mythology
 "Nara", song from the album Unearthed by E.S. Posthumus
 Shikamaru Nara, fictional character in the manga and anime series Naruto
 "Nara", "Arrival In Nara" and "Leaving Nara", songs from the 2014 album This Is All Yours by alt-J

Other uses 
 Nara Hotel, a hotel in Nara, Japan
 Nara Station, a railway station in Nara, Japan
 Nara Television, a Japanese television and radio broadcaster headquartered in Nara, Japan
 Nara University, a private university in Misasagi-cho, Nara, Japan
 Nara Women's University, a national university in Nara, Japan
 Nara period, period of Japanese history, named after the former capital city 
 Japanese ship Nara, several Japanese ships
 Nara plant (Acanthosicyos horridus), a melon species of the Namib desert

NARA as an acronym 
NARA may stand for:
 National Alien Registration Authority, a defunct agency of the Government of Pakistan
 National Amateur Rowing Association, the governing body for rowing by working men in Britain prior to 1956
 National Archives and Records Administration, an agency of the U.S. government
 Neale Analysis of Reading Ability, an assessment of comprehension and word reading accuracy

See also
 Narra (disambiguation)
 Naro (disambiguation)

Language and nationality disambiguation pages
Japanese-language surnames